Xiquets Copenhagen is an international  in Copenhagen, Denmark with an interest in building and promoting human towers, a tradition originating in Catalonia and recognised as a UNESCO Masterpieces of the Oral and Intangible Heritage of Humanity. The team is managed since its foundation by Natàlia Quero Prats, who is helped by a management committee and a technical team.

History
Xiquets Copenhagen was founded in October 2013 by Søren Sandahl, a dane who had been a  member in the Arreplegats de la Zona Universitària team during a stay in Catalonia. When he returned to Denmark, he suggested the creation of a group at the Catalan Cultural Center of Copenhagen (CatalansDK). The group was established as a multicultural organization with the goal of promoting the tradition of human towers in Denmark by holding open rehearsals and organizing public performances. Currently, rehearsals take place in Nørrebro, at either Nørrebro Park Skole or Nørrebrohallen sports complex.

In 2018, the team signed its best performance in history during the II International Day (as a part of the XXVII Human Tower Festival of Tarragona). Its members built and dismantled its first castle of six floors in history, a 3of6 that had previously been unsuccessful. After less than a year, Xiquets Copenhagen broke their record again in Copenhagen, with a performance of a 4of6, 3of6 and a fan of 4 (vof4) on 9 June 2019 in the Rosenborg Castle Gardens, during the III International Human Tower Festival, held in the Danish capital city.

Relevant performances

References

2013 establishments in Denmark
Sports clubs established in 2013
Sports teams in Copenhagen
Castellers